Tobias Kainz (born 31 October 1992) is an Austrian professional footballer who plays as a midfielder for Austrian Bundesliga club TSV Hartberg.

References

External links

1992 births
Living people
People from Südoststeiermark District
Austrian footballers
Association football midfielders
Eredivisie players
SC Heerenveen players
SK Sturm Graz players
SV Grödig players
Austrian Football Bundesliga players
Austria youth international footballers
Austria under-21 international footballers
Footballers from Styria